"Don't Sit Under the Apple Tree (With Anyone Else but Me)" is a popular song that was made famous by Glenn Miller and by the Andrews Sisters during World War II. Its lyrics are the words of two young lovers who pledge their fidelity while one of them is away serving in the war.

Background
Originally titled "Anywhere the Bluebird Goes", the melody was written by Sam H. Stept as an updated version of the nineteenth-century English folk song "Long, Long Ago". Lew Brown and Charles Tobias wrote the lyrics and the song debuted in the 1939 Broadway musical Yokel Boy. After the United States entered the war in December 1941, Brown and Tobias modified the lyrics to their current form, with the chorus ending with "...till I come marching home".

"Don't Sit Under the Apple Tree" remained in Your Hit Parade'''s first place from October 1942 through January 1943. It was the longest period for a war song to hold first place.

On February 18, 1942 the Glenn Miller Orchestra recorded the song with vocals by Tex Beneke, Marion Hutton, and The Modernaires. This record spent thirteen weeks on the Billboard charts and was ranked as the nation's twelfth best-selling recording of the year. In May the song was featured in the film Private Buckaroo as a performance by the Andrews Sisters with the Harry James orchestra and featuring a tap dancing routine by The Jivin' Jacks and Jills. This scene is often considered one of the most memorable of the film. The Andrews Sisters then released the song on Decca Records.  (In a 1971 interview, Patty Andrews reported that this was their most requested song.) Many other artists released records of the song that year, including Kay Kyser. With the Miller, Andrews, and Kyser records all being popular on the radio, "Don't Sit Under the Apple Tree" became one of the few songs in history to have three different versions on the radio hit parade at the same time. The Andrews version was inducted into the Grammy Hall of Fame in 2016.

Other versions
Bing Crosby included the song in a medley on his album On the Happy Side (1962).
In 2012, Broadway icon Carol Channing released a duet of the song with Country singer T. Graham Brown on her album True To The Red, White, and Blue.

Parodies
In 1943, Harold Adamson and Jimmy McHugh wrote "They Just Chopped Down the Old Apple Tree" for the film Around the World as a humorous parody of this song, which was recorded by The Dinning Sisters. 
Frank Loesser's and Arthur Schwartz's "They're Either Too Young or Too Old" from Thank Your Lucky Stars, also references the song when a woman tells her lover that she "can't sit under the apple tree with anyone else but me" because all of the other men her age are also fighting in the war.

Popular culture
More recently, "Don't Sit Under the Apple Tree" was featured in the films:Twelve O'Clock High (1949), With a Song in My Heart (1952), Kiss Them for Me (1957), A Carol for Another Christmas (1964), In Dreams (1999)  The Master (2012). It also featured in the mini-series The PacificAn instrumental muzak version was featured in the film Devil (2010).
A couple of vocal portions of the song were sampled for use in the track "Down to This,"  by the 90s alternative rock band Soul Coughing.
The title of the song was the inspiration for columnist Lewis Grizzard's 1981 book, Don't Sit Under The Grits Tree With Anyone Else But Me.
The title of the song was the inspiration behind Steven J. Andrews' debut novel, 'Don't Sit Under the Apple Tree'.
 The song is prominently featured in Charles Fuller's A Soldier's Play'', winner of the 1982 Pulitzer Prize for Drama, at the beginning and end of each act. 
The song is also featured on the soundtrack at Disney's Hollywood Studios.

References

Songs about trees
The Andrews Sisters songs
Glenn Miller songs
Grammy Hall of Fame Award recipients
1942 songs
1942 singles
Songs of World War II
Songs with lyrics by Lew Brown
Songs written by Charles Tobias
Songs with music by Sam H. Stept